Green Enterprise Initiative (GEI) is a non-profit organization that was launched in early 2009. The organization was created by a group of young professionals in areas such as marketing who are concerned about the excessive waste produced in offices. It is intended to work out achievable ways on balancing of working efficiency and resources conservation, by using creative and out-of-the-box thinking, and make environmental protection an entertaining and stimulating adventure instead of a duty.

Mission statement

GEI's mission is to protect the environment by starting from working places to everyone’s daily routine, and to insert a lot of different creative elements into environmental protection process by:
Promoting achievable ways to protect the environment, that at the same time do not need to sacrifice the original quality of life, so as to shape environmental protection as a new way of lifestyle. 
Introducing innovative and creative strategies to effectively balance work efficiency and resources conservation;
Organizing creative and attractive campaigns to arise public's attention and awareness on environmental protection;
Setting up an award scheme to encourage individuals and corporate to participate in green voluntary works and carry out green policy; to share environmental protection knowledge with others so as to influence people around them; 
Initiating a new lifestyle – LOBELS (Lifestyle of Balancing Ecology and Living Standard) – to preserve the quality of life while carrying out environmental protection.

Major works
Seminars and workshops - to promote environmental protection in office
Award Scheme - to encourage and appreciate outstanding members
Creative and interesting activities - to raise people's awareness towards environmental protection

LOBELS
Lifestyle Of Balancing Ecology and Living Standard (LOBELS) refers to a group of young urban people who enjoy having a quality life and at the same time are concerned about the environment.

External links
 GEI Official Website
 Green-savers (Facebook Group)
 啦啦隊抗嘔電大聯盟

Non-profit organisations based in Hong Kong